Crescent Township is a township in Allegheny County, Pennsylvania, United States and is part of the Pittsburgh Metro Area. The population was 2,640 at the 2010 census.

The township was created in 1855 and was given the name Crescent because it was formed from a portion of Moon Township.  Crescent Township has been assigned the ZIP code 15046.

Crescent Township has two unincorporated villages:
Glenwillard
Wireton

Crescent is part of the Pittsburgh Metropolitan Statistical Area.

Education
Students living in Crescent Township attend the Moon Area School District.

Government and Politics

Geography

Surrounding and adjacent neighborhoods
Crescent Township has three land borders, including Moon Township to the south, southeast and southwest and the Beaver County neighborhoods of South Heights to the north and Hopewell Township to the northwest.  Across the Ohio River to the northeast, Crescent Township runs adjacent with Leetsdale.

Education
Crescent Township is served by the Moon Area School District.

Demographics

As of the census of 2000, there were 2,314 people, 886 households, and 658 families residing in the township.  The population density was 1,115.8 people per square mile (431.6/km2).  There were 920 housing units at an average density of 443.6/sq mi (171.6/km2).  The racial makeup of the township was 97.23% White, 1.25% African American, 0.30% Native American, 0.91% Asian, 0.04% Pacific Islander, and 0.26% from two or more races. Hispanic or Latino of any race were 0.78% of the population.

There were 886 households, out of which 32.6% had children under the age of 18 living with them, 61.7% were married couples living together, 9.7% had a female householder with no husband present, and 25.7% were non-families. 21.2% of all households were made up of individuals, and 9.5% had someone living alone who was 65 years of age or older.  The average household size was 2.60 and the average family size was 3.05.

In the township the population was spread out, with 23.9% under the age of 18, 6.7% from 18 to 24, 31.0% from 25 to 44, 23.4% from 45 to 64, and 14.9% who were 65 years of age or older.  The median age was 38 years. For every 100 females, there were 93.6 males.  For every 100 females age 18 and over, there were 93.2 males.

The median income for a household in the township was $49,500, and the median income for a family was $52,267. Males had a median income of $35,661 versus $25,076 for females. The per capita income for the township was $19,472.  About 3.2% of families and 5.1% of the population were below the poverty line, including 6.4% of those under age 18 and 5.6% of those age 65 or over.

Trivia
Some scenes in the movie The Silence of the Lambs were filmed in the Glenwillard neighborhood of Crescent Township. A house on Front Street was used as the Bimmel house, home of one of Buffalo Bill's victims.  The CSX Transportation (formerly Pittsburgh and Lake Erie Railroad) tracks that traverse the township are clearly visible in the establishing shots.

Notable people
Lou Christie, famous singer/songwriter, grew up in the Glenwillard section of Crescent and attended Moon High School.
 NCAA men's basketball coach John Calipari lived in Crescent when he was an assistant coach at the University of Pittsburgh under Paul Evans.

References

External links
 Township website

Pennsylvania populated places on the Ohio River
Townships in Allegheny County, Pennsylvania